In mathematics and logic, a direct proof is a way of showing the
truth or falsehood of a given statement by a straightforward combination of
established facts, usually axioms, existing lemmas and theorems, without making any further assumptions. In order to directly prove a conditional statement of the form "If p, then q", it suffices to consider the situations in which the statement p is true. Logical deduction is employed to reason from assumptions to conclusion. The type of logic employed is almost invariably first-order logic, employing the quantifiers for all and there exists. Common proof rules used are modus ponens and universal instantiation.

In contrast, an indirect proof may begin with certain hypothetical scenarios and then proceed to eliminate the uncertainties in each of these scenarios until an inescapable conclusion is forced. For example, instead of showing directly p ⇒ q, one proves its contrapositive ~q ⇒ ~p (one assumes ~q and shows that it leads to ~p). Since p ⇒ q and ~q ⇒ ~p are equivalent by the principle of transposition (see law of excluded middle), p ⇒ q is indirectly proved. Proof methods that are not direct include proof by contradiction, including proof by infinite descent.  Direct proof methods include proof by exhaustion and proof by induction.

History and etymology
A direct proof is the simplest form of proof there is. The word ‘proof’ comes from the Latin word probare, which means “to test”.  The earliest use of proofs was prominent in legal proceedings. A person with authority, such as a nobleman, was said to have probity, which means that the evidence was by his relative authority, which outweighed empirical testimony.  In days gone by, mathematics and proof was often intertwined with practical questions – with populations like the Egyptians and the Greeks showing an interest in surveying land. This led to a natural curiosity with regards to geometry and trigonometry – particularly triangles and rectangles. These were the shapes which provided the most questions in terms of practical things, so early geometrical concepts were focused on these shapes, for example, the likes of buildings and pyramids used these shapes in abundance. Another shape which is crucial in the history of direct proof is the circle, which was crucial for the design of arenas and water tanks. This meant that ancient geometry (and Euclidean Geometry) discussed circles.

The earliest form of mathematics was phenomenological. For example, if someone could draw a reasonable picture, or give a convincing description, then that met all the criteria for something to be described as a mathematical “fact”. On occasion, analogical arguments took place, or even by “invoking the gods”. The idea that mathematical statements could be proven had not been developed yet, so these were the earliest forms of the concept of proof, despite not being actual proof at all.

Proof as we know it came about with one specific question: “what is a proof?” Traditionally, a proof is a platform which convinces someone beyond reasonable doubt that a statement is mathematically true. Naturally, one would assume that the best way to prove the truth of something like this (B) would be to draw up a comparison with something old (A) that has already been proven as true. Thus was created the concept of deriving a new result from an old result.

Examples

The sum of two even integers equals an even integer

Since they are even, they can be written as

Then the sum can be written as

It follows that  has 2 as a factor and therefore is even, so the sum of any two even integers is even.

Pythagoras' theorem

Observe that we have four right-angled triangles and a square packed into a large square. Each of the triangles has sides a and b and hypotenuse c. The area of a square is defined as the square of the length of its sides - in this case, (a + b)2. However, the area of the large square can also be expressed as the sum of the areas of its components. In this case, that would be the sum of the areas of the four triangles and the small square in the middle.

We know that the area of the large square is equal to (a + b)2.

The area of a triangle is equal to 

We know that the area of the large square is also equal to the sum of the areas of the triangles, plus the area of the small square, and thus the area of the large square equals 

These are equal, and so

After some simplifying,

Removing the ab that appears on both sides gives

which proves Pythagoras' theorem. ∎

The square of an odd number is also odd 

By definition, if n is an odd integer, it can be expressed as

for some integer k. Thus

Since 2k2+ 2k is an integer, n2 is also odd.  ∎

References

Sources

  (Ch. 1.)

External links

Direct Proof from Larry W. Cusick's How To Write Proofs.
Direct Proofs from Patrick Keef and David Guichard's Introduction to Higher Mathematics.
Direct Proof section of Richard Hammack's Book of Proof.

Mathematical proofs
Logical truth